The nineteenth European Masters Athletics Championships were held in Izmir, Turkey, from August 22–31, 2014. The European Masters Athletics Championships serve the division of the sport of athletics for people over 35 years of age, referred to as masters athletics.

The event had many fewer participants than the previous edition, although three more nations took part than did previously.

Events 
The following events took place:

Men

Results

Men

M35

M40

M45

M50

M55

M60

M65

M70

M75

M80

M85

M90

Women

W35

W40

W45

W50

W55

W60

W65

W70

W75

W80

W85

W90

References 

 
European Masters Athletics Championships
Sports competitions in Izmir
2010s in İzmir